Igor Muratovich Akhba (Abkhaz: Игор Мурат-иҧа Ахба;) (born 5 February 1949) is an Abkhaz diplomat and politician. From 2008 until 2021 he was the first ambassador of the Republic of Abkhazia to the Russian Federation, and in 2004 he was for a short time the Minister for Foreign Affairs of his country.

Early life and career

Igor Akhba was born 5 February 1949 in Sukhumi, in what was then the Abkhazian ASSR. In 1972 he graduated from the faculty of law of the Moscow State University. In 1975 Akhba obtained a degree in Public and International Law from the Post-graduate Institute of State and Law of the USSR Academy of Sciences. From 1976 until 1989 Akhba worked as a research fellow with the V. I. Lenin State Library of the USSR. From 1989 until 1992 he was an assistant in the Supreme Soviet of the Soviet Union.

Diplomatic and political career
In 1992, Igor Akhba was named presidential plenipotentiary to Russia, a post he has held for a long time. On 28 July 2004, Akhba was temporarily appointed Minister for Foreign Affairs of Abkhazia by outgoing President Vladislav Ardzinba. On 14 December 2004, shortly after the height of the crisis following the 2004 presidential election, he was replaced by Sergei Shamba and returned to his posting in Moscow.

On 26 August 2008 the Republic of Abkhazia was formally recognised as independent by the Russian Federation, on 9 September the two states established diplomatic relations and on 14 November Igor Akhba was appointed as the first Abkhazian ambassador to Russia.
On 10 December 2008 he presented his credentials to Grigory Karasin, the State Secretary and Deputy Minister of Foreign Affairs of the Russian Federation, and presented his Letter of Credence to President of Russia Dmitry Medvedev on 16 January 2009.

Awards
Igor Mutarovich Akhba received awards from national and international, inter alia:
Pridnestrovian Moldavian Republic (the medal "20 Years of the Pridnestrovian Moldavian Republic") was received on 17 December 2010 in Moscow awarded by Minister of Foreign Affairs of the Pridnestrovian Moldavian Republic, Vladimir Yastrebchak; Pridnestrovian Moldavian Republic (The Order of Honor Valor of the Pridnestrovian Moldavian Republic) was received on 17 December 2010 in Moscow awarded by Minister of Foreign Affairs of the Pridnestrovian Moldavian Republic, Vladimir Yastrebchak; Republic of Abkhazia (the medal "20 Years of the Ministry of Foreign Affairs of the Republic of Abkhazia") was received on 17 May 2013 in Sukhumi awarded by Minister of Foreign Affairs of the Republic of Abkhazia, Vyacheslav Chirikba; Russian Federation (the breastplate medal of the Ministry of Foreign Affairs of the Russian Federation) was received on 14 February 2014 in Moscow awarded by Deputy of Foreign Minister of the Russian Federation, Grigory Karasin; and South Ossetia (The Order of Friendship of the State of Alania) was received on 7 March 2019 in Moscow awarded by Minister of Foreign Affairs of the State of Alania, Dmitry Medoev.

Family
Igor Akhba is married and has a child.

See also

Sources

References

1949 births
Living people
People from Sukhumi
Ministers for Foreign Affairs of Abkhazia
Ambassadors of Abkhazia to Russia